Tagulandang (Pulau Tagulandang) is one of the Sangihe Islands, situated off the northern tip of Sulawesi, Indonesia. It forms three districts in the Sitaro Islands Regency of North Sulawesi province. It is located between the Celebes and Molucca Seas, and is separated from the Ruang stratovolcano by a narrow sea channel. The inhabitants speak Sangirese, and the 2010 census recorded a population of 19,795, while the 2020 Census revealed a population of 22,296.

References

Tagulandang
Landforms of North Sulawesi
Islands of Sulawesi
Populated places in Indonesia